DXES (801 AM) Bombo Radyo is a radio station owned and operated by Bombo Radyo Philippines through its licensee People's Broadcasting Service. Its studio and transmitter are located at Bombo Radyo Broadcast Center, Amao Rd., Brgy. Bula, General Santos. The station operates daily from 4:30 AM to 9:30 PM.

References

Radio stations in General Santos
Radio stations established in 1968